Charles Venn Pilcher (known as Venn; 4 June 1879 – 4 July 1961) was an Anglican bishop, theologian and writer and translator of hymns. He was a member and the Secretary of the Australian Hymn Supplement Committee, and author of the Preface to the Australian Hymn Supplement to the Book of Common Praise. He wrote hymns and composed tunes for both the original hymn book (produced in Canada) and for the Australian supplement. He was also a keen supporter of the Zionist cause.

Pilcher was born in Oxford and educated at Charterhouse School and Hertford College, Oxford. and ordained in 1903. He was curate of St Thomas' Church, Birmingham and then domestic chaplain to Handley Moule, the Bishop of Durham. He was a professor of the New Testament at Wycliffe College at the University of Toronto and later of the Old Testament. He was canon precentor at the Cathedral Church of St James, Toronto from 1931 to 1936 when he became a lecturer in church history at Moore Theological College, Sydney. He was Bishop Coadjutor of Sydney from his arrival in Sydney until his death.

References

1879 births
People from Oxford
People educated at Charterhouse School
Alumni of Hertford College, Oxford
Academic staff of the University of Toronto
Academic staff of Moore Theological College
20th-century Anglican bishops in Australia
Assistant bishops in the Anglican Diocese of Sydney
Grand Knights of the Order of the Falcon
1961 deaths
Christian Zionists